Accell Group N.V. is a bicycle company based in Heerenveen, Netherlands. They own the bicycle brands Atala, Babboe, Batavus, Carraro Cicli, Ghost, Haibike, KOGA, Lapierre, Loekie, Nishiki, Raleigh, Sparta, Torker, Tunturi, Van Nicholas, Winora, and XLC components.

Accell sells about 1.1 million bicycles a year, mainly in the American and European markets.

In 2017, Accell lost the contract to sell bicycles through the outdoor chain Dick's Sporting Goods. This resulted in a yearly net loss of nearly $6 million.

In August 2019, Accell sold Diamondback, Redline, and IZIP Electric Bikes to Regent, LP. Regent and Accell also announced that they will partner for two years to distribute Raleigh, Haibike, and Ghost, which Accell continues to own.

In January 2022, Accell Group agreed to a €1.56 Billion buyout offer led by the US-based firm KKR.

References

Cycle manufacturers of the Netherlands
Companies based in Friesland
Heerenveen
1998 establishments in the Netherlands